The Swing Sessions is the third studio album by Australian singer/actor David Campbell. It was released in Australia in November 2006, and achieved platinum status.

It was followed a year later by The Swing Sessions 2

Track listing
You're Nobody till Somebody Loves You
Call Me Irresponsible
Mack The Knife
The Way You Look Tonight
Love Me or Leave Me
Can't Take My Eyes off You
Birth Of The Blues
All the Way
Waters of March
Beyond the Sea
Mr Bojangles
With Plenty Of Money And You
My Funny Valentine

Charts

Weekly charts

Year-end charts

Certifications

References

2006 albums
Covers albums
David Campbell (Australian musician) albums
Sony Music Australia albums